Sandra Bloodworth is a labour historian and socialist activist,  based in Melbourne, Australia. She has been involved in radical politics since the 1970s, where she has played roles in the women's, Aboriginal, anti-uranium mining and trade union movements. She is one of the founding members of the Trotskyist organisation Socialist Alternative, in which she plays a leading role. She is also the former editor of Marxist Left Review  as well as having authored several books from a Marxist perspective on the Russian Revolution, the global financial crisis, women's struggles, working class resistance in the Middle East and Australian imperialism.

Selected books 
 A crime beyond denunciation : a Marxist analysis of capitalist economic crisis, Socialist Alternative, Melbourne, 2008.
 How workers took power : the 1917 Russian Revolution, Socialist Alternative, Melbourne, 2008.

Selected articles 
 “Sorry is the first step” Australia’s new labor government issues an apology to the aboriginal population, International Socialist Review, Issue 58, 2008.
 The poverty of patriarchy theory, (Originally published in Socialist Review (Australian), Issue 2, 1990), Socialist Alternative, 2008.

External links 
 Socialist Alternative Online magazine
 Standing up to capitalism and war Audio file of speech delivered at Marxism 2008

References 

Year of birth missing (living people)
Living people
Australian women's rights activists
Australian Trotskyists
Activists from Melbourne
Australian Marxist writers
Australian socialist feminists
Labor historians
Australian anti–nuclear power activists